Triplophysa farwelli is a species of stone loach in the genus Triplophysa. It is found in Iran and the Helmand River drainage in Afghanistan.

Etymology
The fish is named in honor of Major Arthur Evelyn Farwell (1898-1976), the Military Attaché to the British Legation at Kabul, Afghanistan. It was he who sent the type specimen to the Bombay Natural History Society.

References

F
Fish of Afghanistan
Fish of Iran
Taxa named by Sunder Lal Hora
Fish described in 1935